David Hains ( – 22 January 2023) was an Australian billionaire businessman, engineer, and horse breeder. He was the founder and once CEO of Portland House Group, Australia’s largest private investments management firm and hedge fund. According to Forbes, Hains had a personal net-worth of an estimated $2.89 billion making him Australia’s 18th richest person.

Biography
Hains graduated from the University of Melbourne. He started his career as an engineer and in corporate restructuring. In the 1960s, he took a seven-year hiatus from his career to play golf.

Through his Portland House Group, Australia's biggest hedge fund that he managed with his children, Hains invested in equities, fixed interest, property and managed funds globally. In 1993, he sold an investment to Wheeling-Pittsburgh Steel for 107 million.

His horses include Kingston Town, Lowan Star and Rose of Kingston.

Personal life and death
Hains was married to Helen Hains and had five children. His son Richard Hains is a hedge fund manager and author of the novel Chameleon. Helen Hains died on 24 August 2017.

Hains died on 22 January 2023, at the age of 92.

Wealth rankings
In May 2019, The Australian Financial Review estimated Hains' net worth as 2.90 billion as published in the Financial Review Rich List; and in January 2019 his net worth was estimated by Forbes Asia  as 1.90 billion as published in the list of Australia's 50 richest people. , Hains was one of ten Australians who have appeared in every Financial Review Rich List, or its predecessor, the BRW Rich 200, since it was first published in 1984.

References

1930s births
Year of birth uncertain
2023 deaths
Businesspeople from Melbourne
University of Melbourne alumni
Australian racehorse owners and breeders
Australian billionaires
Place of birth missing